Harold Fortuin (born 1964 in Mount Clemens, Michigan) is an American composer, pianist, and designer of hardware and software for electronic music.

He has written both traditional instrumental and vocal music as well as electronic and computer music, and has a number of performances and recordings to his credit. His work has often been in the realm of microtonal music. Aside from the standard 12-tone equal temperament, he has composed in equal temperaments of 19, 22, and 31 notes to the octave. He has also published research in the area of software and hardware design and development.

References

External links 
 Artist's page

1964 births
21st-century classical composers
Living people
Microtonal musicians
21st-century American composers
American male classical composers
American classical composers
21st-century American male musicians